Somalia's coastline consists of the Gulf of Aden to the north, the Guardafui Channel to the northeast and the Indian Ocean to the east. The total length of the coastline is approximately 3333 km, giving the country the longest coastline on mainland Africa. The country has second-longest coastline in all of Africa, behind the island nation of Madagascar (4828 km). 

The coastline is generally divided into two parts, northern and eastern coastlines, separated by the tip of the Horn of Africa known as Cape Guardafui. The city of Mogadishu, the capital of Somalia is situated in the south of the country along the eastern coastline of Somalia. The northern coastline is shared with the Gulf of Aden, the northeastern with Guardafui Channel, and the eastern with the Indian Ocean. The coastline plays a major role in maintaining the economy of the country through fishing and trade; meanwhile, other areas of the economy are not very productive. The northern tip of the coastline meets Djibouti in west and the eastern tip meets Kenya in the south. There are a number of islands near the coastal areas. Ras Caseyr (Cape Guardafui) is the easternmost point of Somalia; this point joins the Guardafui Channel to the Gulf of Aden.

Geographical features
The coastline of Somalia has different conditions throughout its length. Being the second-longest in Africa, this coastline is the easternmost coastline of continental Africa, comprises part of the north-western coastline of the Indian Ocean, and is the nearest coastline to the Socotra Islands, which are part of Yemen. Its continental shelf is spread over 32500 km2. The northern coastline extends from Djibouti to the east of Somalia, and the eastern coastline extends from the north-east to the south-west of Somalia, touching Kenya.

References

Somalia
Geography of Somalia